The 2020 CONCACAF League Final was the final round of the 2020 CONCACAF League, the fourth edition of the CONCACAF League, the secondary club football tournament organised by CONCACAF, the regional governing body of North America, Central America, and the Caribbean.

The final was contested in a single match format between Alajuelense and Saprissa, both clubs being from Costa Rica. The final was hosted by Alajuelense at the Estadio Alejandro Morera Soto in Alajuela on 3 February 2021.

Teams

Road to the final

Note: In all results below, the score of the finalist is given first (H: home; A: away).

Match

Post-match 
Both Alajuelense and Saprissa qualified for the 2021 CONCACAF Champions League for their performance in the CONCACAF League. Alajuelense took on Atlanta United of the United States in the first round, while Saprissa played American side, Philadelphia Union.

References

Final
2020
2020–21 in Costa Rican football
International association football competitions hosted by Costa Rica
February 2021 sports events in North America
Deportivo Saprissa matches
Liga Deportiva Alajuelense matches